La Nava is a town and municipality located in the province of Huelva, Spain. According to the 2015 census, the municipality had a population of 330 inhabitants.

References

[
Municipalities in the Province of Huelva